Daniel Akpeyi (born 3 August 1986) is a Nigerian professional footballer who last played  as a goalkeeper for Kaizer Chiefs and the Nigeria national team.

Club career
Akpeyi began his career with Gabros International F.C. and was promoted to the first team in 2005, but moved to Nasarawa United F.C. in January 2007. He was an undisputed starter for both clubs.

Akpeyi joined Heartland F.C. for their 2010 CAF Champions League campaign, and was again first-choice. In February 2014, it was announced that he had left Heartland to join league rivals Warri Wolves, but a few days later, Heartland denied the move by an official statement, stating that they had no intention to sell their first choice goalkeeper.

In the following month, however, the deal was confirmed again and Akpeyi joined Warri Wolves.

In 2015, he signed a two-year deal with Chippa.

In 2019, he signed with Kaizer Chiefs (nicknamed the Amakhosi).

After being without a club in 2022, he was fancied by Sekhukhune United but the deal failed to materialise.

Personal life
Akpeyi married his long time girl friend Emmanuella Ebert-Kalu in December 2016. In July 2018, they welcomed their first child, Prince Jason Akpeyi, who was born in Port Elizabeth. He is credited for finding the Daniel Akpeyi Children Empowerment Foundation (Dacef) the non profitable organization was founded in 2020. The foundation aim is to help develop Africa by helping the less privileged children get quality Education.

Recently, the Dacef reached out to people in the locations of Gauteng, Johannesburg during the Covid19 worldwide lockdown.

International career

Akpeyi was a member of the Nigeria national under-20 football team at 2005 FIFA World Youth Championship in Netherlands and was in the 22-man squad before the Beijing 2008 Summer Olympics, but did not see action in either tournament. He was also called up to the 23-man squad for the 2014 African Nations Championship as a backup to Chigozie Agbim.

On 6 May 2014, Akpeyi was named in the 30-man provisional squad ahead of 2014 FIFA World Cup.

He made his first full cap in 2015, called in for the friendly vs. South Africa as a replacement for an injured Vincent Enyeama. He saved a penalty and was lauded for his strong keeping in his Man of the Match performance.

He was selected by Nigeria for their 35-man provisional squad for the 2016 Summer Olympics.

In May 2018 he was named in Nigeria's preliminary 30-man squad for the 2018 FIFA World Cup in Russia.

Akpeyi was included in the team's final 23-man list to 2019 Africa Cup of Nations. He kept clean sheets in the team's first two matches. In the final group match Ikechukwu Ezenwa conceded twice in Nigeria's 2–0 defeat to Madagascar. Akpeyi returned to the starting line up in the round of 16 match against the indomitable lions of Cameroon where he conceded 2 goals in his teams 3 - 2 victory. He was also in goal in the team's Q. Final victory over South Africa and their 2 - 1 S. final lost to Algeria. Francis Uzoho was in goal for the third place match against Tunisia.

On 29 January 2020, Akpeyi prolonged his agreement with the South African Premier Soccer League by signing a two-year contract that will retain him with the Amakhosi until June 2022.

On 25 December 2021, he was selected by Nigeria interim coach Eguavoen as one of the 28-man squad final draft for the 2021 Africa Cup of Nations.

Career statistics

International

Honours

Club
Nigerian FA Cup: Winner 2011, 2012

International
Summer Olympic Games: Bronze Medal, Brazil. 2016
African Nations Cup: Bronze Medal, Egypt. 2019
FIFA U-20 World Cup: Silver Medal, Holland. 2005

References

External links

Olympia Profile 

1986 births
Living people
Sportspeople from Nnewi
Nigerian footballers
Nigeria international footballers
Nigeria under-20 international footballers
Association football goalkeepers
Nasarawa United F.C. players
Ifeanyi Ubah F.C. players
Heartland F.C. players
Warri Wolves F.C. players
Chippa United F.C. players
Kaizer Chiefs F.C. players
Footballers at the 2016 Summer Olympics
Olympic footballers of Nigeria
Medalists at the 2016 Summer Olympics
Olympic bronze medalists for Nigeria
Olympic medalists in football
Nigerian expatriate footballers
Expatriate soccer players in South Africa
Nigerian expatriate sportspeople in South Africa
Nigeria Professional Football League players
2018 FIFA World Cup players
2019 Africa Cup of Nations players
Nigeria A' international footballers
2014 African Nations Championship players